Fabrizio de Miranda (30 October 1926 – 21 January 2015) was an Italian bridges and structural engineer and  university professor.

Career
He graduated with a degree in civil engineering in 1950 from the University of Naples. Beginning in 1955 he introduced in Italy steel-concrete composite structures, mainly  in the field of bridges. He planned the first motorway viaducts with  steel structure (Coretta, Macinaie, Poggio Palina) on the Autostrada del Sole in Italy (1959). 
In 1959, he became managing director of the largest Italian steelwork company, "Costruzioni Metalliche Finsider S.p.A." in Milan, which was under his management until 1967. From 1965 until 1996, he was professor of "Tecnica delle costruzioni" (structural engineering) at Politecnico di Milano. He  successfully participated  in numerous National and International Design Competitions of bridges including the first prize ex aequo to the International Competition for the Messina Bridge  as member of the Lambertini Group (1969).  He was among the Founders and then President (in 1970–1973) of the Italian College of the Steel Structures Technicians (CTA).  In 1968, he founded a Consulting Engineering Firm specializing in the design of Bridges and Structures. During more than fifty years of professional activity, he designed hundreds of structures and bridges. Notable projects include the elevated highways in Genoa (1963–1965), in Fiorenza-Milan (1961) and in San Lorenzo-Rome (1969–1976), the viaducts and the Indiano Bridge across the Arno river near Florence (1972–1978), all in Italy; the Zarate-Brazo Largo Bridges in Argentina (1969–1976), and the Rande Bridge in Spain (1973–1977). He died in Milan on 21 January 2015.

Publications in English

 De Miranda F., 1964, Hollow steel sections in the RAI-TV Centre-Turin, n. 12/1964 "Proceedings CIDECT 1964", London 1964.
 De Miranda F., 1966, The role of steelwork in Italian Multi-Storey Buildings – Proceedings B.C.S.A. Dec. 1966.
 De Miranda F., 1968, New concepts for elevated highways, Proceedings B.C.S.A. – London. 24–26 June 1968.
 De Miranda F. e Mele M., 1973, Some basic design principles for steel box girder bridges, In London 13-14 febbraio 1973. Proceedings Institution Civil Engineers.
 De Miranda F., et al., 1979, Basic problems in long span cable stayed bridges, – Rep. n. 25 – Department of Structures – University of Calabria – Arcavacata (CS), ill., (224 p.) 1979.
 Autori vari & De Miranda F., 1983, A contribution to the theory of long span cable-stayed bridges, 11e Congres Association Internationale des Ponts ed Charpentes.
 De Miranda F., 1988, Design – Long Span Bridges, International Symposium on steel bridges. London, 24-25 marzo 1988. In "Costruzioni Metalliche" n. 4/1988.
 De Miranda F., 1991, Some basic problems in the design of long span cable stayed bridges, in Problemi avanzati nella costruzione dei ponti, a cura di G. Creazza e M. Mele, Collana di Ingegneria Strutturale n.7, pp. 91–120, Ed. CISM (International Centre for Mechanical Sciences), Udine 1991. .
 De Miranda F., 1991, The three Mentalities of Successful Bridge Design, in Bridge Aesthetics around the world, Ed. Transportation Research Board – National Research Council, Washington, D.C., U.S.A. 1991.

Bibliography in Italian

 Renato Airoldi, Il concorso per il nuovo ponte sull'Adda a Paderno, in Casabella, n° 469, 1981, pp. 17–25
 Doniselli I., Fabrizio De Miranda: ponti e strutture, in Costruzioni Metalliche, n° 5, 1994
 Gigliola Meneghini, Fabrizio De Miranda nella storia dei ponti in acciaio, tesi di laurea, relatore Enzo Siviero, correlatore Stefania Casucci. – 1999. – 2 v. : ill. ; 30 cm; Istituto universitario di architettura di Venezia. Biblioteca Centrale IUAV TESI 1999 131-32.
 Studio De Miranda Associati, Fabrizio de Miranda, raccolta delle pubblicazioni dal 1951 al 2004, Milano, 2004.
 L. Andreini, Ponte all'Indiano a Firenze, in Rassegna di Architettura e Urbanistica, n. 117,pp. 127–134, Università degli Studi "La Sapienza", Roma 2005.
 Centro Studi del Consiglio Nazionale degli Ingegneri, (a cura di), Fabrizio de Miranda, in L'ingegneria dei ponti del Novecento, Catalogo della Mostra itinerante del 2006, pp. 42–43, Gangemi Editore, Roma 2006.
 De Nardi Diego, Fabrizio De Miranda, Angelo Villa, Lodovico Tramontin. Il padiglione centrale della fiera di Pordenone, Ed. Il Poligrafo (collana Territori dell'architettura. Opere), 2006, .
 Marcello Zordan, Il contributo di Fabrizio de Miranda alla costruzione metallica del secondo novecento in Italia, in Rassegna di Architettura e Urbanistica n. 121/122, pp. 149–158, Università degli studi "La Sapienza", Roma 2007.
 Gianluca Capurso e Patrizia Fermetti (a cura di), Fabrizio de Miranda, in "Rassegna di Architettura e Urbanistica", n. 121/122, p. 165, Università degli Studi "La Sapienza", Roma 2007.

References

External links
 Biography of Fabrizio de Miranda from the Studio de Miranda Associati website 
 Studio De Miranda Associati website
 Structurae database

Bridge engineers
Italian civil engineers
Structural engineers
1926 births
2015 deaths
University of Naples Federico II alumni
Academic staff of the Polytechnic University of Milan